Holy Dio: A Tribute to Ronnie James Dio is a compilation album, released on July 12, 1999. It is a tribute album to Ronnie James Dio, featuring covers of several songs he had sung during his time with Rainbow, Black Sabbath and his own band Dio. The covers done on this tribute album were recorded by mostly power metal bands.

Track listing
 "Neon Knights" - Steel Prophet
 "Man on the Silver Mountain" - HammerFall
 "The Last in Line" - Destiny's End
 "The Sign of the Southern Cross" - Fates Warning
 "Long Live Rock 'n' Roll" - Gamma Ray
 "Egypt (The Chains Are On)" - Doro
 "Children of the Sea" - Jag Panzer
 "Don't Talk to Strangers" - Blind Guardian
 "Still I'm Sad" - Axel Rudi Pell
 "Kill the King" - Primal Fear
 "Shame on the Night" - Solitude Aeturnus
 "Heaven and Hell" - Enola Gay
 "The Temple of the King" - Angel Dust
 "Rainbow Eyes" - Catch the Rainbow

Two-disc version
There is a two-disc version of this album with songs in the following order in the liner notes, although the CDs have the songs in a different order (including the two versions of "Kill the King" being switched):

 Disc one:
 "Don't Talk to Strangers" - Blind Guardian
 "Kill the King" - Primal Fear
 "Egypt (The Chains Are On)" - Doro
 "Children of the Sea" - Jag Panzer
 "Sign of the Southern Cross" - Fates Warning
 "Rainbow Eyes" - Catch the Rainbow
 "Long Live Rock 'n' Roll" - Gamma Ray
 "Country Girl" - Dan Swanö/Peter Tägtgren
 "Gates of Babylon" - Yngwie Malmsteen

 Disc two:
 "We Rock" - Grave Digger
 "Man on the Silver Mountain" - HammerFall
 "Holy Diver" -  Holy Mother
 "Kill the King" - Stratovarius
 "Still I'm Sad" - Axel Rudi Pell
 "Heaven and Hell" - Enola Gay
 "Neon Knights" - Steel Prophet
 "Shame on the Night" - Solitude Aeturnus
 "The Last in Line" - Destiny's End
 "The Temple of the King" - Angel Dust

References

Ronnie James Dio tribute albums
1999 compilation albums
Century Media Records compilation albums